Sport is considered a national pastime in Finland and many Finns visit different sporting events regularly. Pesäpallo is the national sport of Finland, although the most popular forms of sport in terms of television viewers and media coverage are ice hockey and Formula One. In spectator attendance, harness racing comes right after ice hockey in popularity.

Other popular sports include floorball, bandy, football, ringette, and Pesäpallo

Popular sports in Finland

Ice hockey

Ice hockey is the most popular sport in Finland. The Finnish main league Liiga has an attendance average of 4,850 people. Ice Hockey World Championships 2016 final Finland-Canada, 69% Finnish people watched that game in TV MTV3-channel. The Finnish national team has won the World Championship four times, in 1995, 2011, 2019 and in 2022 and is considered a member of the so-called "Big Six", the unofficial group of the six strongest men's ice hockey nations, along with Canada, Czechia, Russia, Sweden and the United States. At the 2022 Winter Olympics, the Finnish hockey team won at the Men's tournament Olympic gold for the first time. Some of the most notable Finnish players are Teemu Selänne, Jari Kurri, Jere Lehtinen, Teppo Numminen, Tuukka Rask and brothers Saku and Mikko Koivu. Finland has hosted Men's Ice Hockey World Championships in 1965, 1974, 1982, 1991, 1997, 2003, 2022 and co-hosted  2012 - 2013 and 2023.

Football

Football in Finland, unlike in most European countries, is not the most popular spectator sport, as it falls behind ice hockey, which enjoys a huge amount of popularity in the country. Football tops ice hockey in the number of registered players (115,000 vs. 60,000) and as a popular hobby (160,000 vs. 90,000 in adults and 230,000 vs. 105,000 in youth). It is the most popular hobby among 3- to 18-year-olds, whereas ice hockey is 9th.
Football's standing is constantly increasing, where the yearly growth rate has lately been over 10 percent. In season 2006–07 19.9 percent of registered players were female. The Football Association of Finland (Palloliitto) has approximately a thousand clubs as its members. According to a Gallup poll, nearly 400,000 people include football in their hobbies.

HJK is the most successful Finnish football club and has won 32 Finnish championship. Also it is only Finnish club that has played in the UEFA Champions League and Europa League in group stage.

Floorball

Floorball is a popular sport and Finland was one of the three founding countries of International Floorball Federation. Finland men's national floorball team has won the World Floorball Championships in 2008, 2010, 2016 and 2018, making floorball the only team sport in which Finland has defended a World Championship title, and placed second in 1996, 2000, 2002, 2006, 2012 and 2014.

Finland has hosted Men's World Floorball Championships in 2002 and 2010 and will host it again in 2020. The game is played similar to floor hockey, with five players and a goal keeper on each team. The game is played indoors for men and woman, using 95 to 115.5 cm. sticks, and a plastic ball. The length of the game is three twenty minute periods.

Motorsport

Motorsport became popular in Finland in the 1950s with the birth of rallying competitions. In the 1960s Finnish rally drivers such as Rauno Aaltonen, Timo Mäkinen and Pauli Toivonen started to dominate international events and have held the post since, making Finland the most successful nation in the World Rally Championship. Juha Kankkunen and Tommi Mäkinen both won the World Championship four times during their respective careers and Marcus Grönholm won the title twice in 2000 and 2002. After 20 years later Kalle Rovanperä won the World Championship in 2022. Finland's WRC event, Neste Oil Rally Finland, gathers 500,000 spectators every year. The city of Jyväskylä in the Central Finland region has often served as the main venue for Finnish rally competitions.

Currently the most popular form of motorsport is Formula One. F1 was popularized in Finland in the 1980s by Keke Rosberg, who in 1982 became the first Finnish Formula One World Driver's champion, and reached its peak when Mika Häkkinen won the championship twice in 1998 and 1999. Kimi Räikkönen, the 2007 champion, has retired from the sport at the end of 2021. Since 2013, Valtteri Bottas has competed for the Williams F1, Mercedes and Alfa Romeo teams.

Other forms of motorsport popular in Finland include Grand Prix motorcycle racing, which reached its peak in the early 1970s before the death of Jarno Saarinen. In enduro, 7 and 11-time World Enduro Champions Kari Tiainen and Juha Salminen have ensured media coverage in their home country.

Bandy

Bandy is played throughout Finland. It was the first team sport with a national Finnish championship. The Bandyliiga is still popular. In 2004, Finland won the Bandy World Championship. The game consists of two teams whose goal is to put a single ball in opposing team's goal to score. The game is played on ice, with both teams on skates. In terms of licensed athletes, it is the second biggest winter sport in the world. Finland's Bandy Association (Finnish: Suomen Jääpalloliitto, Swedish: FinlandsBandyförbund) is the governing body for the sport of bandy in Finland.

Pesäpallo

Developed by Lauri "Tahko" Pihkala in the 1920s and often considered as a national sport of Finland, pesäpallo has a steady popularity around the country, especially in the Ostrobothnia region. The main national league, Superpesis, has an attendance average of about 1,600 in men's and 500 in the women's league.

Ringette

In 1979, Juhani Wahlsten introduced ringette in Finland. Wahlsten created some teams in Turku. Finland's first ringette club was Ringetteläisiä Turun Siniset, and the country's first ringette tournament took place in December, 1980. In 1979 Juhani Wahlsten invited two coaches, Wendy King and Evelyn Watson, from Dollard-des-Ormeaux, a suburb of Montreal, Quebec, Canada, to teach girls of various ages how to play ringette. The Ringette Association of Turku was established in 1981 and several Canadian coaches went there to initiate the training and help establish the sport. The ski national week then organized an annual tournament to bring together all the ringette teams.

Internationally Canada and Finland have always been the most active ambassadors in the International Ringette Federation. Canada and Finland regularly travel across various countries to demonstrate how ringette is played.

Ice cross downhill

Racers are typically athletes with a background in ice hockey, however competitors from the sports of bandy and ringette have also competed with great success, such as Salla Kyhälä from Finland's national ringette team, who also played in Canada's National Ringette League and Mirko Lahti has win Finnish downhill skating championship two times 2020 and 2021. Junior World championship 2017-2018 and Men`s World championship 2022-23.

Synchronized Skating

Inline skating originated in Finland in the 1980s and was initially known as group patterning. The first Finnish Synchronized skating team, The Rockets (HTK; now Helsinki Rockettes), was founded in 1984. Today, Finland is one of the top countries in figure skating - the teams have done well in international competitions for years. There are more than 100 Synchronized skating teams in Finland.

Skiing

FIS Nordic Wolrd Ski Championships Seefeld 2019 - Men 15km Interval Start Classic. Picture shows Iivo Niskanen (FIN).
Finland has always produced successful competitors in the disciplines of nordic skiing. Championship-winning male cross-country skiers from Finland include Veli Saarinen (winner of an Olympic gold and three World Championship titles in the 1920s and 1930s), Veikko Hakulinen (who won three Olympic and three World Championship golds in the 1950s and 1960s, as well as a World Championship silver medal in biathlon) and Juha Mieto (who won an Olympic gold medal in 1976 and two overall FIS Cross-Country World Cups). Among female athletes, Marjo Matikainen-Kallström won a gold at the 1988 Winter Olympics, three World Championships and three overall World Cups and Marja-Liisa Kirvesniemi won three golds at both the Olympics and World Championships and two overall World Cup titles.

Finland has been the most successful nation in Ski jumping at the Winter Olympics, having won ten golds, eight silvers and four bronze medals. Notable names include Matti Nykänen, a four-time Olympic gold medalist, a five time Ski Jumping World Champion, the 1985 winner of the FIS Ski-Flying World Championships, a four-time winner of the overall World Cup title, and a double winner of the prestigious Four Hills Tournament. More recently Janne Ahonen has been one of the top competitors in the sport since the mid-1990s, winning five World Championship golds and two overall World Cups. He is also the record holder for wins in the Four Hills Tournament, having won the competition five times.

As a country strong in both cross-country skiing and ski jumping Finland has also enjoyed success in Nordic combined. Heikki Hasu won golds in Nordic combined in the 1948 and 1952 Olympics, as well as a cross-country gold in the 4 x 10 kilometre relay at the 1952 Olympics. He also won a World Championship gold in 1950. Eero Mäntyranta won 7 Olympic medals (3 golds, 2 silvers, and 2 bronzes) spread over the 1960, 1964, and 1968 Olympics in addition to his five World Championship medals (2 gold, 2 silver and a bronze) spread over the 1962 and 1966 games. Samppa Lajunen won three Olympic golds at the 2002 Olympics and two FIS Nordic Combined World Cups. Hannu Manninen won the World Cup for four consecutive seasons between 2003/4 and 2006/7.

Although traditionally not as strong as Norway, Sweden, Germany and Russia in biathlon, Finland has had world-class competitors in this discipline. Heikki Ikola and Juhani Suutarinen were both highly successful in the 1970s - Ikola won four World Championship golds and Suutarinen won three. In 2011 Kaisa Mäkäräinen won a World Championship title in the pursuit at the Biathlon World Championships and was Biathlon World Cup champion. She won her second overall Biathlon World Cup in 2014, and a third in 2018.

In recent years Finnish skiers have enjoyed success in the technical disciplines of alpine skiing. Kalle Palander was Slalom World Champion in 1999 and World Cup Slalom champion in the 2003 Alpine Skiing World Cup. Tanja Poutiainen won three discipline World Cup titles in Slalom and Giant Slalom in the 2000s.

Athletics

The sport of athletics has historically been an important part of both Finnish sports history and national identity. Hannes Kolehmainen has been said to "run Finland onto the world map" at the 1912 Summer Olympics, and from the 1920 Summer Olympics to World War II Finland was the second most successful country in athletics, as only the United States managed to collect more Olympic medals. Javelin throw is the only event in which Finland has enjoyed success all the way from the 1900s to this day. Thus, it is currently the most popular athletics event in Finland. Jukola Relay and Venla's Relay are the largest and 
the most famous orienteering events in Finland.

Combat sports

Wrestling

Wrestling was a successful sport for Finns in the early 20th century. The first wrestling club was the Helsingin Atleettiklubi founded in 1891, and the Finnish championship series (SM-kilpailut) were organized for the first time in 1898. Verner Weckman won his series At the 1906 Athens Intermediate Olympics and achieved Finland's first official Olympic victory two years later in London. In total, Finns won 20 Olympic gold medals in wrestling between 1908 and 1936, thirteen of them in Greco-Roman wrestling and seven in freestyle wrestling. From the period after the Second World War, Finland has six wrestling gold medals, five of which are from Greco-Roman wrestling. The last Finnish men's world champion is Marko Yli-Hannuksela from 1997, but the European Finns have won championships even in the 2000s, when women's wrestling became more common, and in 2018 Petra Olli became the first Finnish female wrestler to win the world championship.

Boxing

Finnish boxing championship competitions started in 1923. Finnish Olympic champions are Sten Suvio from 1936 and Pentti Hämäläinen from 1952. However, the most famous Finnish boxer of the 1930s was Gunnar Bärlund, who was the second challenger to world champion Joe Louis in the professional boxing heavyweight rankings. The first Finn to compete in the professional world championship was Olli Mäki, who lost to Davey Moore in the World Championship match at the Helsinki Olympic Stadium in August 1962. Mäki is the only Finn who has won both the amateur and professional European championships. The amateur WC medal has been achieved by Tarmo Uusivirta 1978 and 1982, Jyri Kjäll 1993 and Joni Turunen 1995 and 2001. Women's boxing n's biggest star is Eva Wahlström, who in 2015 was the first Finn to win the world championship in professional boxing. Today, Robert Helenius is Finland's most successful boxer.

Mixed martial arts

In judo, Finland's only World Championship medal has been achieved by Juha Salonen, who in 1981 took bronze in the heavyweight category. Jukka-Pekka Väyrynen was the first Finn to win the World Championship in karate in 1982. The most successful Finnish karateka is Sari Laine, who won seven European championships in the years 1987–1996 in addition to her one World Championship in individual series. The first Finn seen in UFC events was Tony Halme, who participated in the UFC 13 event organized on May 30, 1997 in Augusta, Georgia, USA. Halme lost his match in less than a minute to the future star of the sport, Randy Couture, by submission after Couture got a choke hold.  Another Finn who fought in the UFC was Anton Kuivanen, who fought two fights in the organization in 2012 and one fight in 2013. The third Finn in the organization was Tom Niinimäki who won one and lost three matches. Today, one Finnish citizen, Kurd Makwan Amirkhani, is a member of the organization.

American Football

American football has a long history in Finland. The American Football Association of Finland is the governing body and the Vaahteraliiga founded in 1980, is the highest level in Finland signing import talent from North America and Europe. The Finland national American football team has won five European championships.

Basketball

As Finland appeared at the 2014 Basketball World Cup for the first time, the sport received a huge boost and major public attention. More than 8,000 basketball fans travelled to Spain to support their team. Overall, they booked more than 40 airplanes.For the second time, Finland made it in 2023 Basketball World Cup, for the first time through the qualifiers.

As in many countries worldwide, Finland has shown some major improvements in its professionalization of the game of basketball recently. Its Korisliiga sends teams to European competitions and has drawn the interest of an increasing number of talents especially from North America but also from Southeastern Europe.

Fiba Europe Cup in the 2022-23 season, Karhu Basket become the first Finnish club to advance to the final four.

Volleyball

 Finland men's national volleyball team has often participated in the EuroVolley Championships and succeeded steadily. the World Championships also made a comeback in 2014, challenging the big volleyball countries to finish in 9th place. Finland Volleyball League is highest level in Finland.
Finland featured a women's national team in beach volleyball that competed at the 2018–2020 CEV Beach Volleyball Continental Cup.

Disc golf

Disc golf is the fastest growing sport in Finland. According to the Finnish Research Institute for Olympic Sports (KIHU), it is more popular among Finns than ball golf, volleyball, basketball and tennis. , there are approximately 700 disc golf courses in Finland.

Harness racing 

Harness racing in Finland is characterised by the use of the coldblood breed Finnhorse along with modern light trotters such as the Standardbred. In lack of gallop racing culture, harness racing is the main equestrian sport in Finland. Horses used for harness racing in Finland are exclusively trotters.

Racing back home from church had been a tradition long before the first organised race was held in 1817. Modern racing started in the 1960s, when light breeds were allowed to enter the sport and Parimutuel betting gained foothold as pastime. Nowadays harness racing remains popular, with the main events gathering tens of thousands of spectators in the country with a population of some 5 million.

Rugby union

Rugby union is a minor but growing sport. With both Men's and Women's 15's teams are represented in world rankings and both Women and Men's Sevens teams competing internationally. Finland Men's 15's team is currently ranked 86th out of 105 by World Rugby. Finland Women's 15's team is currently ranked 47th out of 56 by World Rugby.

Sport shooting 
The Finnish Shooting Sport Federation is the umbrella organization for sport shooting in Finland.

Controversies 
Arto Halonen made a documentary about doping in sport in Finnish winter sports in 2012. Janne Immonen, Jari Isometsä and Harri Kirvesniemi were convicted in October 2013 by the Helsinki District Court.

International championships hosted by Finland

See also
Finland at the Olympics
The Flying Finns
Sportspersons on List of Finns
Finnish Wheelchair Curling Championship

References

External links
Finnish Olympic Committee
Suomen Urheiluliitto